Mesopolobus is a genus of insects belonging to the family Pteromalidae.

The genus has cosmopolitan distribution.

Species:
 Mesopolobus adrianae Gijswijt, 1990 
 Mesopolobus aeneus (Masi, 1924)

References

Pteromalidae
Hymenoptera genera